The 3rd Cinemalaya Independent Film Festival was held from July 20 until 29, 2007 in Metro Manila, Philippines.

Cinemalaya was presented by the Cultural Center of the Philippines and the Film Development Council of the Philippines.

Entries
The winning film is highlighted with boldface and a dagger.

Full-Length Features

Short films

Awards

Full-Length Features
 Best Film - Tribu by Jim Libiran
 Special Jury Prize - Endo by Jade Castro
 Audience Award - Pisay by Auraeus Solito
 Best Direction - Auraeus Solito for Pisay
 Best Actor - the male ensemble of Tribu
 Best Actress - Ina Feleo for Endo
 Best Screenplay - Dennis Marasigan for Tukso
 Best Cinematography - Rodolfo Aves Jr. for Kadin
 Best Sound - Mark Laccay for Tribu
 Best Original Music Score - Jerrold Tarog for Kadin

Short Films
 Best Short Film - Rolyo by Alvin Yapan
 Special Jury Prize - Nineball by Enrico Aragon
 Audience Award - Doble Vista by  Nisha Alicer and Nix Lañas
 Best Direction - Emmanuel dela Cruz for Gabon
 Best Screenplay - Vic Acedillo for To Ni

References

External links
Cinemalaya Independent Film Festival

Cinemalaya Independent Film Festival
Cinemalaya
Cinemalaya
2007 in Philippine cinema